Augièr Galhard was a 16th-century Occitan language writer from western Languedoc.

Biography 
He was first a wheelwright (for this reason he is also known under the name of Lo Rodièr de rabastens, "rodièr" meaning wheelwright in Occitan language) born in Rabastens in 1540. He then served as a huguenot soldier during the War of Religion under the command of Guillaume de Lherm.

Augièr Galhard was also a rebec player and (both as a poet and as a musician) became an entertainer and thus earn his life both as a soldier and as an artist. Since his carried draw him to northern France, he also composed poetry in French language.

Galhard finally settle in Bearn, political center of Kingdom of Navarre Calvinist court, where the regent Catherine de Bourbon granted him a private income.

Literary work 
Occitan critics such as Jean-Baptiste Noulet and Robert Lafont mention three Occitan language books written by Augièr Galhard :
 Las Obras (Las Obros in the original graphy) printed in 1579, at first censored.
 Lo libre gràs (Lou libre gras) printed 1581 censored for being obscene, with no known remaining edition.
 Lo banquet (Lou banquet)

References and notes

Bibliography 
Gustave de Caussade, Poésies languedociennes et françaises d'Augier Gaillard, Éd. S. Rodière, Albi, 1843

Further reading 
 Noulet, Jean-Baptiste. Essai sur l'histoire littéraire des patois du Midi. Paris : Técherner, 1859.
 Anatole, Christian. Lafont, Robert. Nouvelle histoire de la littérature occitane. Paris : PUF, 1970.

External links 
 Augièr Galhard's Poesias on Google Books
 Augièr Galhard's work on Gallica.fr (French National Library)
 El Apocalypse ou Révélation de Saint Jean (Glahard's French compositions) on Gallica.fr (French National Library)
 Lo banquet on Gallica.fr

Occitan-language writers
16th-century French poets